Assignment – Paris! is a 1952 American Cold War film noir directed by Robert Parrish and starring Dana Andrews, Märta Torén, George Sanders and Audrey Totter.

Premise
Paris-based New York Herald Tribune reporter Jimmy Race (Andrews) is sent by his boss (Sanders) behind the Iron Curtain in Budapest to investigate a meeting involving the Hungarian ambassador. While on assignment, Race is framed for espionage.

Cast
 Dana Andrews as Jimmy Race
 Märta Torén as Jeanne Moray
 George Sanders as Nicholas Strang
 Audrey Totter as Sandy Tate
 Sandro Giglio as Gabor Czeki alias Grisha 
 Donald Randolph as Anton Borvich
 Herbert Berghof as Prime Minister Andreas Ordy 
 Ben Astar as Minister of Justice Vajos 
 Willis Bouchey as Biddle - Editor 
 Earl Lee as Dad Pelham
 Pál Jávor as Laslo Boros 
 Georgiana Wulff as Gogo Czeki

Production
Phil Karlson was the original director, but was fired during filming.

It was filmed on location in Paris and Budapest.

References

External links
 
 
 
 

1952 films
1952 drama films
1950s spy films
American spy films
Cold War spy films
Columbia Pictures films
Films scored by George Duning
Films about journalists
Films directed by Robert Parrish
Films set in Budapest
Films set in Paris
Films shot in Budapest
Films shot in Paris
American black-and-white films
1950s English-language films
Films based on works by Paul Gallico
1950s American films